Daf-5 is an ortholog of the mammalian protein Sno/Ski，which present in the nematode worm Caenorhabditis elegans on the downstream of TGFβ signaling pathway. Without daf-7 signal, daf-5 combined with daf-3, co-SMAD for C. elegans, to form a heterodimer and started dauer development.

References 

Caenorhabditis elegans genes